Lakefest is a festival, which began as a music and cider festival, yet in its second year has booked big UK bands, propelling it to the status of a full-blown music festival.

Origins 

Lakesfest grew out from when Croft Farm Waterpark hosted its music and cider festival on 9 April 2011 It was attended by just over 1,500 people consuming 8,500 pints of cider. Bands including The Stages of Dan, The Roving Crows and The Wurzels starred. Classic West Country games like Welly Wanging and skittles were available to play, with prizes up for grabs. The feedback was so positive that planning went immediately into "Lakefest".

2012 Festival lineup 
The 2012 festival included the following acts:

Friday 9th
 EMF
 Erica
 Kickback
 Rainy and the Dust
 3 Daft Monkeys
 Toploader
 Reef

Saturday 10th
 Levellers
 Dodgy
 Chesney Hawkes
 Roving Crows
 The Wonderstuff
 The Swing Man
 Joe Wheldon
 Smoke Feathers
 ThunderRoad
 Over The Hill
 Missing Andy
 Riff Raff
 Avert Francis
 Little Dave
 Shippers
 Timothy Parkes

2013 Festival Lineup 
The 2013 Lakefest festival occurred over 3 days, on the weekend of 9–11 August 2013. The 2013 festival included the following acts:

Friday 9th
 Ocean Colour Scene
 The Beat
 Missing Andy
 Chip Shop Boys
 Ruffanti

Saturday 10th
 Levellers
 Roving Crows
 The Crazy World Of Arthur Brown
 Duke Special
 Cosmo Jarvis
 Baka Beyond
 Erica
 Gaz Brookfield
 Funmilayo

Sunday 11th
 Chas & Dave
 3 Daft Monkeys
 Jim Lockey & The Solemn Sun
 Wille & The Bandits
 Avert Francis

2014 Festival Lineup 
The 2014 Lakefest festival occurred over 3 days, on the weekend of 8–10 August 2014. The 2014 festival included the following acts:

Friday 8th
 Buzzcocks
 Snap!
 Bad Cardigan
 Sons Of Navarone
Saturday 9th
 Shed Seven
 The Lightning Seeds
 the Bad Shepherds
 Sarah Warren Band
 Sons Of Earnest
 Neville Staple Band
Sunday 10th
 Fun Lovin' Criminals
 The Roving Crows
 Gaz Brookfield
 Doctor and the Medics

2015 Festival Lineup 
The 2015 Lakefest festival occurred over 3 days, on the weekend of 7–9 August 2015. The 2015 festival included the following acts:

Friday 7th
 Ash
 goldie lookin chain
 babajack
 haunted souls
 lloyd yates
 ferocious dog
Saturday 8th
 Billy Bragg
 Embrace
 Cheeky Girls
 Dreadzone
 New Model Army Band
 Notorious Brothers
Sunday 9th
 D Ream
 Hayseed Dixie
 Nizlopi
 Simon Murphy
 The Magic Numbers
 The Roving Crows

2016 Festival Lineup 
The 2016 Lakefest festival returned for a 5th year and moved to a new location at Eastnor Castle deer park nr Ledbury Herefordshire  now occurred over 4 days, from 11–14 August 2016. The 2016 festival included the following acts:

Acts Appearing over the four days from Thursday -Sunday included to name a few:
 The Coral
 Newton Faulkner
 Starsailor
 Big Country
 The Roving Crows
 Jasper In The Company Of Others

2017 Festival Lineup 
The 2017 Lakefest festival occurred over 4 days, from 10–13 August 2017. The 2017 festival included the following acts:

Thursday 10th
 The No Good Nancys
 Paul 0'Neil
 Ash C
 The Road
 Zombies
 Dead Frequency
 Water for Dogs
Friday 11th
 Feeder
 Wilko Johnson
 Kila
 The Minkie Whales
Saturday 12th
 The Charlatans
 Alabama 3
 Aswad
 Arcadia Roots
 Chimp On A Bike
 Turin Brakes
 Skewwhiff
 Lost Boy
Sunday 13th
 Imelda May
 Seth Lakeman
 Badly Drawn Boy
 The Roving Crows
 Paul Terry
 Josh Fletcher

2018 Festival Lineup 
The 2018 Lakefest festival is due to occur over 4 days, from 9–12 August 2018. The main acts have been revealed for the 2018 festival:
 Reverend And The Makers
 Dub Pistols
 Pop Will Eat Itself
 Arcadia Roots
 Marc Almond
 Toploader
 The Proclaimers
 The Darkness
 The Farm
 Melanie C
 Peter Hook and The Light
 Roving Crows

References

External links 

 The official site of Lakefest Festival
 Lakefest on eFestivals
 SoGlos online magazine for Gloucestershire
 This is Gloucestershire festival announcement
 Lakefest on FestivalsForAll.com

Counterculture festivals
Music festivals in Gloucestershire
2011 establishments in England
Music festivals established in 2011
Annual events in the United Kingdom